Shyqyri Shala (born 5 July 1965) is a retired Albanian footballer who played as a defender for Besa Kavajë in the Albanian Superliga. He was capped 2 times with the Albania national football team.

International career
He made his debut for Albania in a May 1993 FIFA World Cup qualification match against Latvia and earned a total of 2 caps, scoring no goals. His other international game was another World Cup qualification match, 11 days after his first, against the Republic of Ireland.

Personal life
Shala was a cousin of Apolonia legend Kujtim Majaci.

References

External links

1965 births
Living people
Footballers from Kavajë
Albanian footballers
Association football defenders
Albania international footballers
Besa Kavajë players
Kategoria Superiore players